Curtis Naughton (born 25 February 1995) is a professional rugby league footballer who last played for Hull F.C. in the Super League.

Background
Naughton was born in Dewsbury, West Yorkshire, England.

Playing career

Bradford
Naughton started his professional career with the Bradford Bulls, signing a three-year contract in November 2012. He made his first team début in the final game of the 2013 Super League season against the Huddersfield Giants. Despite having two years remaining on his contract, he left the club at the end of the season to move to Australia with his mother.

Sydney Roosters
In October 2013, Naughton signed a two-year contract with Sydney Roosters.

Hull
In October 2014, after spending a season playing for the Sydney Roosters' under-20s side, Naughton signed a one-year contract with Hull F.C. to return to the Super League. In May 2015, Naughton scored his first senior hat-trick for the club, as they beat the Castleford Tigers 40-14. This was followed by another hat-trick in August, this time against St. Helens at Langtree Park. In March 2016 Naughton signed a two-year contract extension that could keep him at the club until the end of 2018.

Statistics
Statistics do not include pre-season friendlies.

Leigh Centurions 2017

References

External links
Hull F.C. profile
Leigh Centurions profile

1995 births
Living people
Bradford Bulls players
Doncaster R.L.F.C. players
English rugby league players
Hull F.C. players
Leigh Leopards players
Rugby league fullbacks
Rugby league players from Dewsbury